Core Design Limited (known as Rebellion (Derby) Ltd between 2006 and 2010) was a British video game developer based in Derby. Founded in May 1988 by former Gremlin Graphics employees, it originally bore the name Megabrite until rebranding as Core Design in October the same year. The company was acquired by umbrella company CentreGold in December 1994, which in turn was acquired by Eidos Interactive in April 1996. In May 2006, the Core Design personnel and assets were acquired by Rebellion Developments, and the company became Rebellion Derby, which was then shut down in March 2010.

History 

Based in the city of Derby, England, Core Design was founded in 1988 by Chris Shrigley, Andy Green, Rob Toone, Terry Lloyd, Simon Phipps, Dave Pridmore, Jeremy Heath-Smith, Kevin Norburn and Greg Holmes. Most were former employees of Gremlin Graphics. The studio was part of distribution company CentreGold when it was acquired by Eidos Interactive in 1996. Heath-Smith regarded the acquisition as a relief, commenting, "The funding of development is so expensive that I doubt we could have continued to fund ourselves as an independent company." Eidos subsequently sold most of CentreGold, but retained U.S. Gold, the owners of Core Design.

The company is widely known for the Tomb Raider series. The first game was created by Toby Gard and Paul Douglas, released in 1996, and followed by several sequels. The success of the first Tomb Raider has been credited with making Eidos Interactive a major force in the industry, and turned Eidos's 1996 pretax loss of $2.6 million into a $14.5 million profit. In September 1997, Sony Computer Entertainment's U.S. arm, SCEA, signed an agreement with Eidos to keep the franchise exclusive to the PlayStation console. The deal was extended to include Tomb Raider III. Fourth and fifth games in the franchise, Tomb Raider: The Last Revelation and Tomb Raider Chronicles respectively, followed.

After the critical failure of Tomb Raider: The Angel of Darkness in 2003, parent company Eidos put Crystal Dynamics, another Eidos-owned studio, in charge of Tomb Raider franchise development. This prompted members of the Core Design management team and development staff to leave the company and establish a new company, Circle Studio.

In May 2006, Eidos announced that independent developer Rebellion Developments had acquired Core Design's assets and staff, while the Core brand and intellectual property, including Tomb Raider, remained in Eidos' possession.

In June 2006, Crystal Dynamics was confirmed to have a PSP anniversary edition of the original Tomb Raider in development. Remnants of the Core Design team (under the banner of Rebellion) went on to work on several titles in years since, including Shellshock 2: Blood Trails and Rogue Warrior. Starting in January 2010, due to an expiring lease on Rebellion Derby's offices, Rebellion Developments started seeking restructuring opportunities for the studio. As no other possibility than closure was found, Rebellion Derby was closed down effective on 17 March 2010.

Legacy 

In July 2010, shortly after the closure of the studio, a nearby road in Derby was named "Lara Croft Way", in honour of the studio's contribution to the creative industries.

Games developed

References 

Square Enix
Eidos
Rebellion Developments
Defunct companies of England
Software companies of England
Video game companies established in 1988
Video game companies disestablished in 2010
Defunct video game companies of the United Kingdom
Video game development companies
Companies based in Derby
1988 establishments in England
2010 disestablishments in England